The following is a list of Oricon number-one singles of 2019.

Chart history

See also
List of Oricon number-one albums of 2019

References

2019 in Japanese music
Japan Oricon Singles
Lists of number-one songs in Japan